The 2022 Girls' Youth European Volleyball Championship was the 15th edition of the Girls' Youth European Volleyball Championship, a biennial international volleyball tournament organised by the European Volleyball Confederation (CEV) the girls' under-17 national teams of Europe. The tournament was held in Czech Republic (host cities Hradec Králové and Prostějov) from 16 to 24 July 2022.

Same as previous editions, the tournament acted as the CEV qualifiers for the World Championship. Following the decision of the FIVB Board of Administration, the age categories for the age-group events have been aligned so the teams qualified for the FIVB Volleyball Girls' U19 World Championship instead of previous Girls' U18.

Both the CEV and FIVB later excluded Belarus and Russia from participation in all competitions at the start of March.

Qualification

Venues

Pools composition
The drawing of lots was held on 5 May 2022 and performed as follows:
Organiser, Czech Republic, were seeded in Pool I
The highest ranked participating team from the CEV European Ranking, Turkey, were seeded in Pool II
Remaining 10 participating teams drawn after they were previously placed in five cups as per their position in the latest European Ranking

Result

Preliminary round

Pool I

|}

|}

Pool II

|}

|}

5th–8th classification

5th–8th Semifinals

|}

7th place match

|}

5th place match

|}

Final round

Semifinals

|}

3rd place match

|}

Final

|}

Final standing

Awards
At the conclusion of the tournament, the following players were selected as the tournament dream team.

Most Valuable Player
  Safa Allaoui
Best Setter
  Safa Allaoui
Best Outside Spikers
  Erika Esposito
  Ceylin Kuyan

Best Middle Blockers
  Linda Manfredini
  Begüm Kaçmaz
Best Opposite Spiker
  Leana Grozer
Best Libero
  Danica Ružić

References

External links
Official website

Girls' Youth European Volleyball Championship
2022 in volleyball
Europe
Volleyball
International volleyball competitions hosted by the Czech Republic
Volleyball European Championship (girls)
Volleyball